Homai railway station is on the Southern Line of the Auckland railway network in New Zealand. It has an Island platform layout. A bus stop and a park and ride facility are located adjacent to the station.

History

The North Island Main Trunk Line through South Auckland opened in 1875. However, Homai Station didn't open until 15 August 1924. In line with other stations opened in Auckland suburbs at the time, it was partly financed by local developers. In the case of Homai, John Dreadon donated £500 and land for the station and the bridge, which replaced a level crossing. Three other landowners also contributed. As a result, it was decided to name the station using the Māori word for 'gift', homai, rather than Browns Rd, as it was initially referred to.

Daily boardings were measured as 338 in 2003. This figure had jumped to 936 by 2010. The station was upgraded in 2006 with a modern shelter, platform lighting and a much longer platform installed.

Services
Auckland One Rail, on behalf of Auckland Transport, operates suburban services to Britomart, Papakura and Pukekohe via Homai. The typical weekday off-peak timetable is:
3 tph to Britomart, via Penrose and Newmarket
3 tph to Papakura

Homai station is served by bus route 365. Bus route 361 also passes close by.

Access

There are three ways to access the platform. There is a ramp down from the Browns Road Overbridge to the south end of the platform. There is a pedestrian level crossing from the park and ride carpark (which is on Dalgety Drive) to the south end of the platform, and there is another pedestrian level crossing from McVilly Road to the north end of the platform.

See also 
 List of Auckland railway stations

References 

Rail transport in Auckland
Railway stations in New Zealand